Taccarum is a genus of flowering plants in the family Araceae. It is endemic to South America. The genus tends to grow in rocky areas.

Species
Taccarum caudatum Rusby - Bolivia, Peru, Acre State in western Brazil
Taccarum crassispathum E.G.Gonç. - central Brazil
Taccarum peregrinum (Schott) Engl.  - Paraguay, southern Brazil, Misiones Province of Argentina
Taccarum ulei Engl. & K.Krause - eastern Brazil
Taccarum warmingii Engl. - southern Brazil
Taccarum weddellianum Brongn. ex Schott - Bolivia, Peru, Paraguay, central and western Brazil

References

Aroideae
Araceae genera
Flora of South America
Taxa named by Heinrich Wilhelm Schott
Taxa named by Adolphe-Théodore Brongniart